Gaza–Israel clashes may refer to:
 2022 Gaza–Israel clashes
 Gaza–Israel clashes (November 2019)
 Gaza–Israel clashes (May 2019)
 Gaza–Israel clashes (November 2018)
 March 2012 Gaza–Israel clashes
 March 2010 Israel–Gaza clashes

See also
 Gaza–Israel conflict